Stelly is a surname. Notable people with the surname include:

Joel Stelly (born 1984), American football player
Vic Stelly (1941–2020), American businessman and politician

See also
Stell (surname)